Ralph Bergmann (born May 26, 1970 in Ruit auf den Fildern, Baden-Württemberg) is a volleyball player from Germany, who played for the National Team in the 2000s. He played as a middle-blocker.

Honours
2001 FIVB World League — 13th place
2001 European Championship — 9th place
2002 FIVB World League — 9th place
2003 FIVB World League — 10th place
2006 FIVB World Championship — 9th place
2007 European Championship — 5th place

References
 FIVB biography

1970 births
Living people
People from Ostfildern
Sportspeople from Stuttgart (region)
German men's volleyball players
Volleyball players at the 2008 Summer Olympics
Olympic volleyball players of Germany